Radical SAM is a designation for a superfamily of enzymes that use a [4Fe-4S]+ cluster to reductively cleave S-adenosyl-L-methionine (SAM) to generate a radical, usually a 5′-deoxyadenosyl radical (5'-dAdo), as a critical intermediate. These enzymes utilize this radical intermediate to perform diverse transformations, often to functionalize unactivated C-H bonds. Radical SAM enzymes are involved in cofactor biosynthesis, enzyme activation, peptide modification, post-transcriptional and post-translational modifications, metalloprotein cluster formation, tRNA modification, lipid metabolism, biosynthesis of antibiotics and natural products etc. The vast majority of known radical SAM enzymes belong to the radical SAM superfamily, and have a cysteine-rich motif that matches or resembles CxxxCxxC. rSAMs comprise the largest superfamily of metal-containing enzymes.

History and mechanism
As of 2001, 645 unique radical SAM enzymes have been identified from 126 species in all three domains of life. According to the EFI and SFLD  databases, more than 220,000 radical SAM enzymes are predicted to be involved in 85 types of biochemical transformations.

The mechanism for these reactions entail transfer of a methyl or adenosyl group from sulfur to iron.  The resulting organoiron complex subsequently releases the organic radical.  The latter step is reminiscent of the behavior of adenosyl and methyl cobalamins.

Nomenclature 
All enzymes including radical SAM superfamily follow an easy guideline for systematic naming. Systematic naming of enzymes allows a uniform naming process that is recognized by all scientists to understand corresponding function. The first word of the enzyme name often shows the substrate of the enzyme. The position of the reaction on the substrate will also be in the beginning portion of the name. Lastly, the class of the enzyme will be described in the other half of the name which will end in suffix -ase. The class of an enzyme will describe what the enzyme is doing or changing on the substrate. For example, a ligase combines two molecules to form a new bond.

Reaction classification 
Representative enzymes will be mentioned for each class. Radical SAM enzymes and their mechanisms known before 2008 are summarized by Frey et al. Since 2015, additional review articles on radical SAM enzymes are available, including:

 Recent Advances in Radical SAM Enzymology: New Structures and Mechanisms: 
 Radical S-Adenosylmethionine Enzymes: 
 Radical S-Adenosylmethionine (SAM) Enzymes in Cofactor Biosynthesis: A Treasure Trove of Complex Organic Radical Rearrangement Reactions: 
 Molecular architectures and functions of radical enzymes and their  proteins:

Carbon methylation 
Radical SAM methylases/methyltransferases are one of the largest yet diverse subgroups and are capable of methylating a broad range of unreactive carbon and phosphorus centers. These enzymes are divided into four classes (Class A, B, C and D) with representative methylation mechanisms. The shared characteristic of the three major classes A, B and C is the usage of SAM, split into two distinct roles: one as a source of a methyl group donor, and the second as a source of 5'-dAdo radical. The recently documented class D utilizes a different methylation mechanism.

Class A sub-family 
 Class A enzymes methylates specific adenosine residues on rRNA and/or tRNA. In other words, they are RNA base-modifying radical SAM enzymes.
 The most mechanistically well-characterized are enzymes RlmN and Cfr. Both enzymes methylates substrate by adding a methylene fragment originating from SAM molecule. Therefore, RlmN and Cfr are considered methyl synthases instead of methyltransferases.

Class B sub-family 
 Class B enzymes are the largest and most versatile which can methylate a wide range of carbon and phosphorus centers.
 These enzymes require a cobalamin (vitamin B12) cofactor as an intermediate methyl group carrier to transfer a methyl group from SAM to substrate.
 One well-investigated representative enzyme is TsrM which involves in tryptophan methylation in thiostrepton biosynthesis.

Class C sub-family 
 Class C enzymes are reported to play roles in biosynthesis of complex natural products and secondary metabolites. These enzymes methylate heteroaromatic substrates  and are cobalamin-independent.
 These enzymes contain both the radical SAM motif and exhibit striking sequence similarity to coproporhyrinogen III oxidase (HemN), a radical SAM enzyme involved in heme biosynthesis 
 Recently, detailed mechanistic investigation on two important class C radical SAM methylases have been reported:
 TbtI is involved in the biosynthesis of potent thiopeptide antibiotic thiomuracin.
 Jaw5 is suggested to be responsible for cyclopropane modifications.

Class D sub-family 
 Class D is the most recently discovered and has been shown to not use SAM for methylation which is different from the three classes described above. Instead, these enzymes use methylenetetrahydrofolate as the methyl donor.
 The prototype MJ0619 is proposed to play a role in the biosynthesis of cofactor methanopterin which is required in methanogesis, an essential methane-producing pathway dominantly found in the Archaean domain.

Methylthiolation of tRNAs 
Methythiotransferases belong to a subset of radical SAM enzymes that contain two [4Fe-4S]+ clusters and one radical SAM domain. Methylthiotransferases play a major role in catalyzing methylthiolation on tRNA nucleotides or anticodons through a redox mechanism. Thiolation modification is believed to maintain translational efficiency and fidelity.

MiaB and RimO are both well-characterized and bacterial prototypes for tRNA-modifying methylthiotransferases

 MiaB introduces a methylthio group to the isopentenylated A37 derivatives in the tRNA of S. Typhimurium and E. coli by utilizing one SAM molecule to generate 5'-dAdo radical to activate the substrate and a second SAM to donate a sulfur atom to the substrate.
 RimO is responsible for post-translational modification of Asp88 of the ribosomal protein S12 in E. coli. A recently determined crystal structure sheds light on the mechanistic action of RimO. The enzyme catalyzes pentasulfide bridge formation linking two Fe-S clusters to allow for sulfur insertion to the substrate.

eMtaB is the designated methylthiotransferase in eukaryotic and archaeal cells. eMtaB catalyzes the methylthiolation of tRNA at position 37 on N6-threonylcarbamoyladenosine. A bacterial homologue of eMtaB, YqeV has been reported and suggested to function similarly to MiaB and RimO.

Sulfur insertion into unreactive C-H bonds 
Sulfurtransferases are a small subset of radical SAM enzymes. Two well-known examples are BioB and LipA which are independently responsible for biotin synthesis and lipoic acid metabolism, respectively.

 BioB or biotin synthase is a radical SAM enzyme that employs one [4Fe-4S] center to thiolate dethiobitin, thus converting it to biotin or also known as vitamin B7. Vitamin B7 is a cofactor used in carboxylation, decarboxylation, and transcarboxylation reactions in many organisms.
 LipA or lipoyl synthase is radical SAM sulfurtransferase utilizing two [4Fe-4S] clusters to catalyze the final step in lipoic acid biosynthesis.

Carbon insertion 
Nitrogenase is a metallozyme with essential function in the biological nitrogen fixation reaction. The M-cluster ([MoFe7S9C-homocitrate]) and P-cluster ([Fe8S7]) are highly unique metalloclusters present in nitrogenase. The best-studied nitrogenase up-to-date is Mo nitrogenase with M-cluster and P-cluster bearing important roles in substrate reduction. The active site of Mo nitrogenase is the M-cluster, a metal-sulfur cluster containing a carbide at its core. Within the biosynthesis of M-cluster, radical SAM enzyme NifB has been recognized to catalyze a carbon insertion reaction, leading to formation of a Mo/homocitrate-free precursor of M-cluster.

Anaerobic oxidative decarboxylation 
 One well-studied example is HemN. HemN or anaerobic coproporphyrinogen III oxidase is a radical SAM enzyme that catalyzes the oxidative decarboxylation of coproporphyrinogen III to protoporhyrinogen IX, an important intermediate in heme biosynthesis. A recently published study shows evidence supporting HemN utilizes two SAM molecules to mediate radical-mediated hydrogen transfer for the sequential decarboxylation of the two propionate groups of coproporphyrinogen III.
 Hyperthermophilic sulfate-reducing archaen Archaeoglobus fulgidus has been recently reported to enable anaerobic oxidation of long chain n-alkanes. PflD is reported to be responsible for the capacity of A. fulgidus to grow on a wide range of unsaturated carbons and fatty acids. A detailed biochemical and mechanistic characterization of PflD is still undergoing but preliminary data suggest PflD may be a radical SAM enzyme.

Protein post-translational modification 

 Formyl-glycine dependent sulfatases require the critical post-translational modification of an active site cysteine or serine residue into a Cα-formylglycine. A radical SAM enzyme called anSME catalyze this post-translational modification in an oxygen-independent manner.

Protein radical formation 
Glycyl radical enzyme activating enzymes (GRE-AEs) are radical SAM subset that can house a stable and catalytically essential glycyl radical in their active state. The underlying chemistry is considered to be the simplest in the radical SAM superfamily with H-atom abstraction by the 5'-dAdo radical being the product of the reaction. A few examples include:

 Pyruvate formate-lyase activating enzyme (PFL-AE) catalyzes the activation of PFL, a central enzyme in anaerobic glucose metabolism in microbes.
 Benzylsuccinate synthase (BSS) is a central enzyme in anaerobic toluene catabolism.

Peptide modifications 
Radical SAM enzymes that can catalyze sulfur-to-alpha carbon thioether cross-linked peptides (sactipeptides) are important to generate an essential class of peptide with significant antibacterial properties.  These peptides belong to the emerging class of ribosomally synthesized and post-translationally modified peptides (RiPPs).

Another important subset of peptide-modifying radical SAM enzymes is SPASM/Twitch domain-carrying enzymes. SPASM/Twitch enzymes carry a functionalized C-terminal extension for the binding of two [4Fe-4S] clusters, especially important in post-translational modifications of peptides.

The following examples are representative enzymes that can catalyze peptide modifications to generate specific natural products or cofactors.

 TsrM in thiostrepton biosynthesis
 PoyD and PoyC in polytheonamide biosynthesis
 TbtI in thiomuracin biosynthesis
 NosN in nosiheptide biosynthesis
YydG in  biosynthesis
 MoaA in molybdopterin biosynthesis
 PqqE in pyrroloquinoline quinone biosynthesis
 TunB in tunicamycin biosynthesis
 OxsB in oxetanocin biosynthesis
 BchE in anaerobic bacteriochlorophyll biosynthesis
 F0 synthases in F420 cofactor biosynthesis
 MqnE and MqnC in menaquinone biosynthesis
 QhpD in post-translational processing of quinohemoprotein amine dehydrogenase
RumMC2 in ruminococcin C biosynthesis

Epimerization 
Radical SAM epimerases are responsible for the regioselective introduction of D-amino acids into RiPPs. Two well-known enzymes have been thoroughly described in RiPP biosynthetic pathways.

Two well-known enzymes have been thoroughly described in RiPP biosynthetic pathways.

 PoyD installs numerous D-stereocenters in enzyme PoyA to ultimately help facilitate polytheonamide biosynthesis.<ref name="Mahanta_2017" / Polytheoamide is a natural potent cytoxic agent by forming pores in membranes. This peptide cytotoxin is naturally produced by uncultivated bacteria that exist as symbionts in a marine sponge.
 YydG epimerase modifies two amino acid positions on YydF in Gram-positive Bacillus subtilis. A recent study has reported the extrinsically added YydF mediates subsequent dissipation of membrane potential via membrane permeabilization, resulting in death of the organism.

Complex carbon skeleton rearrangements 
Another subset of radical SAM superfamily has been shown to catalyze carbon skeleton rearrangements especially in the areas of DNA repair and cofactor biosynthesis.

 DNA spore photoproduct lysase (SPL) is a radical SAM that can repair DNA thymine dimers (spore product, SP) caused by UV radiation. Despite of remaining unknowns and controversies involving SPL-catalyzed reaction, it is certain that SPL utilizes SAM as a cofactor to generate 5'-dAdo radical to revert SP to two thymine residues.
 HydG is a radical SAM responsible for generating CO and CN− ligands in the [Fe-Fe]-hydrogenase (HydA) in various anaerobic bacteria.
 Radical SAM MoaA and MoaC are involved in converting GTP into cyclic pyranopterin monophosphate (cPMP). Overall, both play important roles in molybdopterinbiosynthesis.

Other reactions 
 A recent study has reported a novel radical SAM enzyme with intrinsic lyase activity that is able to catalyze lysine transfer reaction, generating archaea-specific archaosine-containing tRNAs.
 Viperin is an interferon-stimulated radical SAM enzyme which converts CTP to ddhCTP (3ʹ-deoxy-3′,4ʹdidehydro-CTP), which is a chain terminator for viral RdRps and therefore a natural antiviral compound.

Clinical considerations 
 Deficiency in human tRNA methylthiotransferase eMtaB has been shown to be responsible for abnormal insulin synthesis and predisposition to type 2 diabetes.
 Mutations in human GTP cyclase MoaA has been reported to lead to molybdenum cofactor deficiency, a usually fatal disease accompanied by severe neurological symptoms.
 Mutations in human wybutosine-tRNA modifying enzyme Tyw1 promotes retrovirus infection.
 Alterations in human tRNA-modifying enzyme Elp3 results in progression into amyotrophic lateral sclerosis (ALS).
 Mutations in human antiviral RSAD1 has been shown to be associated with congenital heart disease.
 Mutations in human sulfurtransferase LipA has been implicated in glycine encephalopathy, pyruvate dehydrogenase and lipoic acid synthetase deficiency.
 Mutations in human methylthiotransferase MiaB are related to impaired cardiac and respiratory functions.

Therapeutic applications 
Microbes have been extensively used for the discovery of new antibiotics. However, a growing public concern of multi-drug resistant pathogens has been emerging in the last few decades. Thus, newly developed or novel antibiotics are in utmost demand. Ribosomally synthesized and post-translationally modified peptides (RiPPs) are getting more attention as a newer and major group of antibiotics thanks to having a very narrow of activity spectrum, which can benefit patients, as their side effects will be lesser than the broad-spectrum antibiotics. Below are a few examples of radical SAM enzymes have been shown to be promising targets for antibiotic and antiviral development.

 Inhibition of radical SAM enzyme MnqE in menaoquinone biosynthesis is reported to be an effective antibacterial strategy against H. pylori.
 Radical SAM enzyme BlsE has recently been discovered to be a central enzyme in blasticidin S biosynthetic pathway. Blasticidin S produced by Streptomyces griseochromogenes exhibits strong inhibitory activity against rice blast caused by Pyricularia oryzae Cavara. This compound specifically inhibits protein synthesis in both prokaryotes and eukaryotes through inhibition of peptide bond formation in the ribosome machinery.
 A new fungal radical SAM enzyme has also been recently reported to facilitate the biocatalytic routes for synthesis of 3'-deoxy nucleotides/nucleosides. 3'deoxynucleotides are an important class of drugs since they interfere with the metabolism of nucleotides, and their incorporation into DNA or RNA terminates cell division and replication. This activity explains why this compound is an essential group of antiviral, antibacterial or anticancer drug.

Examples 
Examples of radical SAM enzymes found within the radical SAM superfamily include:

 AblA - lysine 2,3-aminomutase (osmolyte biosynthesis - N-epsilon-acetyl-beta-lysine)
 AlbA - subtilosin maturase (peptide modification)
 AtsB - anaerobic sulfatase activase (enzyme activation)
 BchE - anaerobic magnesium protoporphyrin-IX oxidative cyclase (cofactor biosynthesis - chlorophyll)
 BioB - biotin synthase (cofactor biosynthesis - biotin)
 BlsE - cytosylglucuronic acid decarboxylase - blasticidin S biosynthesis
 BtrN - butirosin biosynthesis pathway oxidoreductase (aminoglycoside antibiotic biosynthesis)
 BzaF - 5-hydroxybenzimidazole (5-HBI) synthesis (cobalt binding ligand of cobalamin) 
 Cfr - 23S rRNA (adenine(2503)-C(8))-methyltransferase - rRNA modification for antibiotic resistance
 CofG - FO synthase, CofG subunit (cofactor biosynthesis - F420)
 CofH - FO synthase, CofH subunit (cofactor biosynthesis - F420)
 CutD - trimethylamine lyase-activating enzyme
 DarE - darobactin maturase
 DesII - D-desosamine biosynthesis deaminase (sugar modification for macrolide antibiotic biosynthesis)
 EpmB - elongation factor P beta-lysylation protein (protein modification)
 HemN - oxygen-independent coproporphyrinogen III oxidase (cofactor biosynthesis - heme)
 HmdB - 5,10-methenyltetrahydromethanopterin hydrogenase cofactor biosynthesis protein HmdB (note unusual CX5CX2C motif)
 HpnR - hopanoid C-3 methylase (lipid biosynthesis - 3-methylhopanoid production)
 HydE - [FeFe] hydrogenase H-cluster radical SAM maturase (metallocluster assembly)
 HydG - [FeFe] hydrogenase H-cluster radical SAM maturase (metallocluster assembly)
 LipA - lipoyl synthase (cofactor biosynthesis - lipoyl)
 MftC - mycofactocin system maturase (peptide modification/cofactor biosynthesis - predicted)
 MiaB - tRNA methylthiotransferase (tRNA modification)
 MoaA - GTP 3',8-cyclase (cofactor biosynthesis - molybdopterin)
 MqnC - dehypoxanthine futalosine cyclase (cofactor biosynthesis - menaquinone via futalosine)
 MqnE - aminofutalosine synthase (cofactor biosynthesis - menaquinone via futalosine)
 NifB - cofactor biosynthesis protein NifB (cofactor biosynthesis - FeMo cofactor)
 NirJ - heme d1 biosynthesis radical SAM protein NirJ (cofactor biosynthesis - heme d1)
 NosL - complex rearrangement of tryptophan to 3-methyl-2-indolic acid - nosiheptide biosynthesis 
 NrdG - anaerobic ribonucleoside-triphosphate reductase activase (enzyme activation)
 PflA - pyruvate formate-lyase activating enzyme (enzyme activation)
 PhpK - radical SAM P-methyltransferase - antibiotic biosynthesis
 PqqE - PQQ biosynthesis enzyme (peptide modification / cofactor biosynthesis - PQQ)
 PylB - methylornithine synthase, pyrrolysine biosynthesis protein PylB (amino acid biosynthesis - pyrrolysine)
 QhpD (PeaB) - quinohemoprotein amine dehydrogenase maturation protein (enzyme activation)
 QueE - 7-carboxy-7-deazaguanine (CDG) synthase
 RimO - ribosomal protein S12 methylthiotransferase
 RlmN - 23S rRNA (adenine(2503)-C(2))-methyltransferase (rRNA modification)
 ScfB - SCIFF maturase (peptide modification by thioether cross-link formation) 
 SkfB - sporulation killing factor maturase
 SplB - spore photoproduct lyase (DNA repair)
 ThiC - 4-amino-5-hydroxymethyl-2-methylpyrimidine phosphate (HMP-P) biosynthesis (cofactor biosynthesis - thiamine)
 ThiH - thiazole phosphate biosynthesis (cofactor biosynthesis - thiamine)
 TrnC - thuricin biosynthesis
 TrnD - thuricin biosynthesis
 TsrT - tryptophan 2-C-methyltransferase (amino acid modification - antibiotic biosynthesis)
 TYW1 - 4-demethylwyosine synthase (tRNA modification)
 YqeV - tRNA methylthiotransferase (tRNA modification)

Non-canonical 
In addition, several non-canonical radical SAM enzymes have been described. These cannot be recognized by the Pfam hidden Markov model PF04055, but still use three Cys residues as ligands to a 4Fe4S cluster and produce a radical from S-adenosylmethionine. These include

 ThiC (PF01964) - thiamine biosynthesis protein ThiC (cofactor biosynthesis - thiamine) (Cys residues near extreme C-terminus) 
 Dph2 (PF01866) - diphthamide biosynthesis enzyme Dph2 (protein modification - diphthamide in translation elongation factor 2) (note different radical production, a 3-amino-3-carboxypropyl radical) 
 PhnJ (PF06007) - phosphonate metabolism protein PhnJ (C-P phosphonate bond cleavage)

References

External links 
Structure Function Linkage Database (SFLD) List of Reactions

Enzymes